Kerripit River, a perennial river of the Manning River catchment, is located in the Upper Hunter district of New South Wales, Australia.

Course and features
Kerripit River rises below Careys Peak in the Barrington Tops within the Great Dividing Range, in the Barrington Tops National Park, and flows generally northeast before reaching its confluence with the Barrington River, north northwest of the village of Berrico. The river descends  over its  course.

See also 

 Rivers of New South Wales
 List of rivers of New South Wales (A–K)
 List of rivers of Australia

References

Rivers of New South Wales
Rivers of the Hunter Region
Mid-Coast Council